The 6th World Freestyle Skating Championships were held in Lishui, China from August 23 to August 25, 2012.

Participating nations
24 nations entered the competition.

Medal table

References

Roller skating competitions
2012 in Chinese sport
2012 in roller sports